2-Bromo-1-chloropropane, C3H6BrCl, is an alkyl halide.  This simple compound has a chiral center and is used sometimes to determine the enantiomeric resolution of simple chromatographic methods.

References

Organobromides
Organochlorides